All Saints Chapel (or All Saints' Chapel) may refer to:

All Saints Chapel, Instow, a combined Church of England chapel and community centre in Instow, Devon, England
All Saints Chapel and Morris Family Burial Ground, in Morris, Otsego County, New York, listed on the National Register of Historic Places (NRHP)
All Saints' Chapel (Rosendale, New York), listed on the NRHP
All Saints' Chapel (Sewanee), located on the campus of Sewanee: The University of the South in Sewanee, Tennessee
All Saints Chapel, Somerford, a chapel of ease attached to Somerford Hall, Cheshire, England
Royal Chapel of All Saints, a church in the grounds of Windsor Great Park, Berkshire, England

See also
All Saints Church (disambiguation)
All Saints Episcopal Church (disambiguation)